Astraea is a genus of medium to large sea snails, marine gastropod mollusks in the family Turbinidae, the turban snails.

Etymology
The Latin genus Astraea means star, with reference to the star-shape of these snails, also commonly called star shells.

Description
They have the appearance of a smooth conical shell. The outer edges of the coiled whorls are quite flattened, with prominent axial sculpture. Below widely, it is umbilicate and concave.

Species
Extant species within this genus include:
Astraea heliotropium (Martyn, 1784)

Fossil records
This genus is known in the fossil records from the Paleocene to the Quaternary (age range: from 61.7 to 0.0 million years ago). Fossils of species within this genus have been found in the sediments of Europe, Australia, United States, Japan, Venezuela, Colombia and Brazil.

Species
Extinct species within this genus include:
†Astraea (Liotiastralium) venezuelana  Weisbord 1962
†Astraea (Pomaulax) gradata  Grant and Gale 1931
†Astraea (Pomaulax) morani  Loel and Corey 1932
†Astraea (Vitiastraea) holmesi  Ladd 1966
† Astraea bicarinata Suter, 1917 
†Astraea fimbriata  Borson 1821
 Astraea heliotropium (Martyn, 1784)
†Astraea stellare  Gmelin 1791
† Astraea stirps Laws, 1932 
†Astraea tentoriiformis  Jonas, 1844

Species brought into synonymy

†Astraea (Australium) rhodestoma  Lamarck 1822: synonym of Astralium rhodostomum (Lamarck, 1822)
 Astraea americana (Gmelin, 1791): synonym of  Lithopoma americanum (Gmelin, 1791)
 Astraea andersoni (Smith, 1902): synonym of Bolma andersoni (Smith, 1902)
 Astraea babelis (P. Fischer, 1874): synonym of Uvanilla babelis (P. Fischer, 1874)
 Astraea brevispina (Lamarck, 1822): synonym of Lithopoma brevispina (Lamarck, 1822)
 Astraea buschii (Philippi, 1844): synonym of Uvanilla buschii (Philippi, 1844)
 Astraea calcar (Linnaeus, 1758): synonym of Astralium calcar (Linnaeus, 1758)
Astraea cookii (Gmelin, 1791): synonym of Cookia sulcata (Lightfoot, 1786)
 Astraea cubanum Philippi, 1849: synonym of Lithopoma tectum (Lightfoot, 1786) 
Astraea danieli Alf & Kreipl, 2006: synonym of Astralium danieli (Alf & Kreipl, 2006)
 Astraea dominicana A. H. Verrill, 1950: synonym of Lithopoma tuber (Linnaeus, 1758) 
 Astraea gilchristi (G. B. Sowerby III, 1903): synonym of Bolma bathyraphis (E. A. Smith, 1899)
 Astraea heimburgi (Dunker, 1882): synonym of Astralium heimburgi (Dunker, 1882)
 Astraea hokianga Laws, 1948: synonym of Bembicium hokianga (Laws, 1948)
 Astraea imbricata (Gmelin, 1791): synonym of Lithopoma tectum (Lightfoot, 1786)
 Astraea imbricatum Gmelin, 1791: synonym of Lithopoma tectum (Lightfoot, 1786)
 Astraea jacquelineae Marche-Marchad, 1957: synonym of Bolma jacquelineae (Marche-Marchad, 1957)
 Astraea johnstoni (Odhner, 1923): synonym of Bolma johnstoni (Odhner, 1923)
 Astraea lapidifera Röding, 1798: synonym of Xenophora (Xenophora) conchyliophora (Born, 1780)
 Astraea latispina (Philippi, 1844): synonym of Astralium latispina (Philippi, 1844)
 Astraea longispina Lamarck, 1822: synonym of Lithopoma phoebium longispina (Lamarck, 1822)
 Astraea milloni B. Salvat, F. Salvat & Richard, 1973: synonym of Astralium milloni (B. Salvat, F. Salvat & Richard, 1973)
 Astraea olfersii (Philippi, 1846): synonym of  Lithopoma americanum (Gmelin, 1791)
 Astraea olivacea (W. Wood, 1828): synonym of Uvanilla olivacea (W. Wood, 1828)
 Astraea papillatum Potiez & Michaud, 1838: synonym of Lithopoma tectum (Lightfoot, 1786)
 Astraea persica Dall, 1907: synonym of Bolma persica (Dall, 1907)
 Astraea petrothauma Berry, 1940: synonym of Megastraea turbanica (Dall, 1910)
 Astraea phoebia Röding, 1798: synonym of Lithopoma phoebium (Röding, 1798)
 Astraea polaris Röding, 1798: synonym of Stellaria solaris (Linnaeus, 1764)
 Astraea rhodostoma Lamarck, 1822: synonym of Astralium rhodostomum (Lamarck, 1822)
 Astraea rugosa (Linnaeus, 1767): synonym of Bolma rugosa (Linnaeus, 1767)
 Astraea rupicollina Stohler, 1959: synonym of Megastraea turbanica (Dall, 1910)
 Astraea semicostata (Kiener, 1850): synonym of Astralium semicostatum (Kiener, 1850)
 Astraea sirius Hedley, C., 1923: synonym of Astralium tentoriiforme (Jonas, 1845)
 Astraea spirata (Dall, 1911): synonym of Pomaulax spiratus (Dall, 1911)
 Astraea sulcata (Martyn, 1784): synonym of Cookia sulcata (Lightfoot, 1786)
 Astraea tayloriana (E. A. Smith, 1880): synonym of Bolma tayloriana (E. A. Smith, 1880)
 Astraea tectum Lightfoot, 1786: synonym of Lithopoma tectum (Lightfoot, 1786)
 Astraea tuber (Linnaeus, 1758): synonym of Lithopoma tuber (Linnaeus, 1758) 
 Astraea tuberosum: synonym of Astralium rhodostomum (Lamarck, 1822)
 Astraea undosa (Wood, 1828): synonym for Lithopoma undosum (Wood, 1828)
 Astraea unguis (Wood, 1828): synonym of Uvanilla unguis (W. Wood, 1828)
 Astraea venezuelensis Flores & Caceres, 1984: synonym of Lithopoma tuber (Linnaeus, 1758)

References

 Gofas, S.; Afonso, J.P.; Brandào, M. (Ed.). (S.a.). Conchas e Moluscos de Angola = Coquillages et Mollusques d'Angola. [Shells and molluscs of Angola]. Universidade Agostinho / Elf Aquitaine Angola: Angola. 140 pp.
 Williams, S.T. (2007). Origins and diversification of Indo-West Pacific marine fauna: evolutionary history and biogeography of turban shells (Gastropoda, Turbinidae). Biological Journal of the Linnean Society, 2007, 92, 573–592

External links 

 
Turbinidae
Gastropod genera
Extant Selandian first appearances